The Department of Agriculture and Aquaculture in the Canadian Province of New Brunswick was formed when Shawn Graham became Premier on October 3, 2006. He split the departments, introducing a Bill On March 2, 2007, disbanding the Department of Agriculture, Fisheries and Aquaculture and creating the Department of Agriculture and Aquaculture and a separate Department of Fisheries. Once it received Royal Assent, the Bill was retroactive to October 3, 2006.

The first Department of Agriculture was created in 1882 by the government of then Premier Daniel Hanington.

Ministers

Agriculture
New Brunswick
Ministries established in 2006
2006 establishments in New Brunswick
Agricultural organizations based in Canada